Since 1990, The International Society of Environmental Ethics (ISEE) has striven to advance research and education in the field of environmental ethics and philosophy, and to promote appropriate human use, respect, conservation, preservation, and understanding of the natural world. In conjunction with the International Association for Environmental Philosophy (IAEP) and sponsorship from the Center for Environmental Philosophy, the society hosts an annual joint ISEE-IAEP conference each summer. It also has regular sessions at the three divisional conferences of the American Philosophical Association and publishes the ISEE Newsletter.

ISEE was an official observer NGO at the United Nations Conference on Environment and Development, Rio de Janeiro, June 1992. Holmes Rolston and J. Baird Callicott were the delegates. ISEE participated in the United Nations Conference on Ethical Issues in Agenda 21, January 1994, at the United Nations in New York.

ISEE maintains an extensive website and it sponsors the largest bibliography in the world on environmental ethics, the Online Bibliography of Environmental Thought (OBET), with over 16,000 entries. It publishes a newsletter three times a year, with newsletters from the past twenty years available at the organization's website.

References

External links 
 ISEE website

Ethics organizations
Environmental ethics
International environmental organizations